The Owl Bar and Cafe, in San Antonio, New Mexico was opened in 1945 by Frank and Dee Chavez as an expansion to J.E. Miera's grocery store business.  Its earliest customers were the scientists working on the Manhattan Project.  It is known throughout the United States for its green chile cheeseburgers.  It is also known for its wall of dollars, pinned there by customers, and donated to charity once a year.

Inside the Owl Bar is a 25-foot mahogany bar built by the Brunswick-Balke-Collender Company, now known as the Brunswick Corporation.  It was originally part of the A.H. Hilton Mercantile, owned by Augustus Halvorston Hilton, father of Conrad Hilton, founder of Hilton Hotels.  After a fire destroyed the mercantile in 1945, the Brunswick bar was salvaged from the wreckage and installed in back of the grocery store to create the first iteration of the Owl Bar and Café.

References

Buildings and structures in Socorro County, New Mexico
Restaurants in New Mexico
1945 establishments in New Mexico
Restaurants established in 1945